Gurney is an English surname of Anglo-Norman origin.

Notable families
The Gurney family (Norwich),  Quakers in England that established Gurney's bank: 
Anna Gurney (1795–1857), Old English scholar
Catherine Gurney (1848–1930), English activist
Daniel Gurney (1791–1880), banker and antiquary
Elizabeth Fry née Gurney (1780–1845), prison reformer and philanthropist
Hudson Gurney (1775–1864), English antiquary, verse-writer, and politician
Isabel Charlotte Gurney (Isabel Talbot, Baroness Talbot de Malahide) (1851–1932), English philanthropist
John Henry Gurney Sr. (1819–1890), banker and amateur ornithologist, son of Joseph John Gurney
Joseph John Gurney (1788–1847), banker, brother of Elizabeth Fry and father of John Henry Gurney
Robert Gurney (1879–1950), English zoologist
Samuel Gurney (1786–1856), banker and philanthropist
English shorthand pioneers: 
Thomas Gurney (shorthand writer) (1705–1770), first known official shorthand writer
Sir John Gurney (judge) (1768–1845), barrister and judge
William Brodie Gurney (1777–1855), shorthand writer and philanthropist
Joseph Gurney (1804–1879), British shorthand writer and biblical scholar
English clergymen and civil servants (related to the banking family):
Archer Thompson Gurney (1820–1887), Church of England clergyman and hymn writer
John Hampden Gurney (1802–1862), Anglican clergyman and hymnist
Richard Gurney (1790–1843), vice-warden of the stannaries, and father of Archer Thompson Gurney
Edmund Gurney (divine) (d.1648), English clergyman, divine and anti-Catholic writer
Russell Gurney (1804–1878), English Conservative Party politician
American professional auto racing drivers:
Dan Gurney (1931–2018), father of Alex Gurney
Alex Gurney (born 1974), son of Dan Gurney

Others with this surname
A. R. Gurney (1930–2017), American playwright and novelist
Alison Gurney (born 1957), Scottish pharmacologist
Andy Gurney (b. 1974), English footballer 
Alexander George Gurney (1902–1955), Australian cartoonist and comic strip creator
Bobby Gurney (1907–1994), English football player
Charles Raymond Gurney (1906-1942), Australian aviator
Charles W. Gurney (1840-1913), American businessman
Daryl Gurney (b. 1986), Northern Irish darts player
Edmund Gurney (1847-1888), English psychologist and psychic researcher.
Edward Gurney (1868—1938), English cricketer who played for Gloucestershire
Edward J. Gurney (1914–1996), U.S. Representative and Senator from Florida
Eric Gurney (1910–1992), Canadian cartoonist who worked with the Walt Disney Company
Sir Goldsworthy Gurney (1793–1875), British scientist
Harry Gurney (b. 1986), English cricket player 
Sir Henry Gurney (Henry Lovell Goldsworthy Gurney) (1898–1951), British High Commissioner in Malaya
Ivor Gurney (1890–1937), English composer and war poet
James Gurney (born 1958), U.S. artist best known as the creator and illustrator of the Dinotopia books
Jason Gurney (1910-1973), British sculptor who fought in the Spanish Civil War
Jeremiah Gurney (1812-1886), American daguerreotype photographer
John Chandler Gurney (1896–1985), U.S. Senator from South Dakota
Margaret Gurney (1908–2002), American mathematician, statistician, and computer programmer
Margaret Gurney (artist) (b.1943), Australian artist
Oliver Gurney (1911–2001), English assyriologist and hittitologist
Peter Gurney (1938-2006), English guinea pig campaigner
Rachel Gurney (1920–2001), English actor
Sir Richard Gurney (d.1647), 1st Baronet, English merchant, Lord Mayor of London.
Ronald Wilfred Gurney (1898–1953), British theoretical physicist
Scott Gurney (b. 1976), American actor and executive producer
Stan Gurney (1908–1942), Australian recipient of the Victoria Cross
Steve Gurney (b. 1963), New Zealand multisport and triathlon athlete

In fiction
Gladys Gurney, a member of the extended Simpson family in The Simpsons
Jack Arnold Alexander Tancred Gurney, protagonist of Peter Barnes' 1968 play, The Ruling Class.